Song Pek Kei is a member of the Legislative Assembly of Macau. She is the youngest lawmaker ever elected to the Legislative Assembly, at age 28 in 2013.

Early life

She graduated from the University of Macao with a Bachelor of Laws degree.

Election results

References

1985 births
Living people
Members of the Legislative Assembly of Macau
Macau women in politics
Macau United Citizens Association politicians